The 1970 Cronulla-Sutherland Sharks season was the 4th in the club's history. They competed in the NSWRFL's 1970 premiership.

Ladder

References

Cronulla-Sutherland Sharks seasons
Cronulla-Sutherland Sharks season